Münip Uzsoy (1878; Constantinople (Istanbul) – July 29, 1950; Istanbul) was an officer of the Ottoman Army and the Turkish Army. The family name is often listed as "Özsoy", and occasionally as "Urgay".

Medals and decorations
Order of the Medjidie 5th class
Order of Osmanieh 4th class
Medal of the Battle of Greece
Gallipoli Star (Ottoman Empire)
Silver Medal of Liyakat
Silver Medal of Imtiyaz
Prussia Iron Cross 1st and 2nd class
Medal of Independence with Red Ribbon

See also
List of high-ranking commanders of the Turkish War of Independence

Sources

1878 births
1950 deaths
Military personnel from Istanbul
Ottoman Military Academy alumni
Ottoman Army officers
Ottoman military personnel of the Greco-Turkish War (1897)
Ottoman military personnel of the Balkan Wars
Ottoman military personnel of World War I
Turkish Army officers
Turkish military personnel of the Greco-Turkish War (1919–1922)
Burials at Turkish State Cemetery
Recipients of the Order of the Medjidie, 5th class
Recipients of the Liakat Medal
Recipients of the Imtiyaz Medal
Recipients of the Iron Cross (1914), 1st class
Recipients of the Medal of Independence with Red Ribbon (Turkey)